The Union Mundial pro Interlingua (UMI; World Interlingua Union) is a global organization that promotes Interlingua, an international auxiliary language (IAL) published in 1951 by the International Auxiliary Language Association (IALA). UMI was founded on July 28, 1955, when the first International Interlingua Congress took place in Tours, France. The UMI collaborates with the national Interlingua organizations and has a hand in publishing dictionaries, grammars and tutorials. It is a non-profit organization that now operates out of Bilthoven, Netherlands.

The Executive Council performs the daily work of the UMI and currently consists of
President: Barbara Rubinstein, Sweden
Secretary-general: Sven Frank, Germany
Vice-secretary: Martijn Dekker, Netherlands
Treasurer: Alberto Mardegan, Italy
The General Council establishes the policies of the UMI. It consists of fifteen individuals residing in Northern, Central, and Eastern Europe, South America, West Asia, and East Asia. Ferenc Jeszenszky, in Hungary, is Coordinator of the Linguistic Commission of the UMI.

On August 3, 2006, the UMI was registered juridically by France as an international organization. This recognition allows the UMI to form international collaborations and to act in its own name as, for example, a juridical body. The Union Interlinguiste de France helped to secure registration.

References

 "Factos del UMI," Panorama in Interlingua, 2006, Issue 4, p. 3.
 "UMI officialmente registrate in Francia," Panorama in Interlingua, 2006, Issue 4, p. 3.
 "Union Mundial pro Interlingua," Panorama in Interlingua, 2006, Issue 4, p. 27.

External links 
 Union Mundial pro Interlingua
 Union Interlinguiste de France
 Societate Svedese pro Interlingua

Interlingua organizations
International organisations based in the Netherlands
1955 establishments in France
Organizations established in 1955